Serpocaulon fraxinifolium is a species of fern in the family Polypodiaceae. It is native to Mexico, Central and South America. Under the synonym Polypodium scutulatum , it was regarded as endemic to Ecuador and threatened by habitat loss.

References

Polypodiaceae
Flora of Mexico
Flora of Central America
Flora of South America
Taxonomy articles created by Polbot
Taxobox binomials not recognized by IUCN